John Henry Richardson CMG (1 July 18908 June 1970) was a British academic.  An economics professor at the University of Leeds who visited the Soviet Union in the early 1930s.

References

1890 births
1970 deaths
British economists
Academics of the University of Leeds